Derek Godfry Ian Amos (born 5 August 1942) is an Australian politician.

He was born at Greenford to carpenter Harold Arthur Edward Amos and Irene Mary. He attended Traralgon High School and worked as a painter from 1956. In 1962 he married Noela Matters, with whom he had three children. A painting contractor from 1963, he also worked as an insurance salesman and driver. In 1966, motivated by opposition to the Vietnam War, he joined the Labor Party, becoming treasurer of the Traralgon branch. In 1967 he was president of Latrobe Valley Young Labor. In 1970 he was elected to the Victorian Legislative Assembly for Morwell. He was the party spokesman on state development from 1971 to 1973 and on minerals and energy from 1973 to 1981, and contested the leadership in 1976 without success. In 1981 he resigned due to ill health.

References

1942 births
Living people
Australian Labor Party members of the Parliament of Victoria
Members of the Victorian Legislative Assembly
20th-century Australian politicians